was a town located in Hita District, Ōita Prefecture, Japan.

On March 22, 2005, Ōyama, along with the town of Amagase, and the villages of Kamitsue, Maetsue and Nakatsue (all from Hita District), was merged into the expanded city of Hita.

Dissolved municipalities of Ōita Prefecture